Idahluy-e Kuchek (also Romanized as Īdahlūy-e Kūchek; also known as ‘Alīābād and Īdahlū-ye Kūchek) is a village in Gavdul-e Sharqi Rural District, in the Central District of Malekan County, East Azerbaijan Province, Iran. At the 2006 census, its population was 128, in 29 families.

References 

Populated places in Malekan County